The 2019 Advantage Cars Prague Open, also known as Advantage Cars Prague Open by Moneta Money Bank for sponsorship reasons, was a professional tennis tournament played on outdoor clay courts. It was the 26nd (men) and 15th (women) editions of the tournament which was part of the 2019 ATP Challenger Tour and the 2019 ITF Women's World Tennis Tour. It took place in Prague, Czech Republic between 22 and 28 July 2019.

Men's singles main-draw entrants

Seeds

1 Rankings are as of July 15, 2019.

Other entrants
The following players received wildcards into the singles main draw:
 Martin Damm
 Jonáš Forejtek
 Lukáš Klein
 Jiří Lehečka
 Robin Staněk

The following player received entry into the singles main draw as an alternate:
 Michael Vrbenský

The following players received entry into the singles main draw using their ITF World Tennis Ranking:
 Riccardo Bonadio
 Corentin Denolly
 Peter Heller
 Tom Jomby
 Karim-Mohamed Maamoun

The following players received entry from the qualifying draw:
 Vít Kopřiva
 Pavel Nejedlý

Women's singles main-draw entrants

Seeds

 1 Rankings are as of 15 July 2019.

Other entrants
The following players received wildcards into the singles main draw:
  Denisa Hindová
  Monika Kilnarová
  Johana Marková
  Martina Přádová

The following player received entry as a special exempt:
  Jesika Malečková

The following players received entry from the qualifying draw:
  Sara Cakarevic
  Nicoleta Dascălu
  Barbora Miklová
  Magdaléna Pantůčková
  Marine Partaud
  Teliana Pereira
  Anastasia Pribylova
  Lucrezia Stefanini

The following players received entry to the draw as Lucky Losers:
  Manon Arcangioli
  Aneta Laboutková

Champions

Men's singles

 Mario Vilella Martínez def.  Tseng Chun-hsin 6–4, 6–2.

Women's singles

 Tamara Korpatsch def.  Denisa Allertová, 7–5, 6–3

Men's doubles

 Ariel Behar /  Gonzalo Escobar def.  Andrey Golubev /  Aleksandr Nedovyesov 6–7(4–7), 7–5, [10–8].

Women's doubles

 Nicoleta Dascălu /  Raluca Șerban def.  Lucie Hradecká /  Johana Marková, 6–4, 6–4

References

External links
 2019 Advantage Cars Prague Open at ITFtennis.com
 Official website

2019 ITF Women's World Tennis Tour
2019 ATP Challenger Tour
Prague Open
Advantage Cars Prague Open
Prague Open